A deadbolt is a type of locking mechanism.

Deadbolt may also refer to:

 Deadbolt (band), an American rock band
 Deadbolt (film), a 1992 Canadian television film
 "Deadbolt" (Thrice song), 2002
 "Deadbolt" (Skaters song), 2013
 Deadbolt (video game), a 2018 side-scrolling stealth-action game
 Deadbolt, a Marvel Comics character resurrected in the Necrosha storyline